The Pontotoc City School District is a public school district based in Pontotoc, Mississippi (USA).

It covers almost all of Pontotoc and some unincorporated areas.

Schools
Pontotoc High School
In the 2011–2012 school year, the Pontotoc High School Lady Warriors basketball team was 34–0 and were State Champions.
2003 National Blue Ribbon School
Pontotoc Junior High School
1992–1993 National Blue Ribbon School
D.T. Cox Elementary School
1989–1990 and 1998–1999 National Blue Ribbon School
Pontotoc Elementary School

Demographics

2006-07 school year
There were a total of 2,298 students enrolled in the Pontotoc City School District during the 2006–2007 school year. The gender makeup of the district was 48% female and 52% male. The racial makeup of the district was 27.72% African American, 66.80% White, 5.00% Hispanic, and 0.48% Asian. 41.1% of the district's students were eligible to receive free lunch.

Previous school years

Accountability statistics

See also
List of school districts in Mississippi

References

External links
 

Education in Pontotoc County, Mississippi
School districts in Mississippi